Country Code: +689
International Call Prefix: 00

French Polynesia has used a closed eight digit plan since 2014.
The numbering plan as of February 2019 is as follows. VITI, a new mobile operator, were expected to enter the market during 2019.

International dialing format: +689 XX XX XX XX

Fixed

Note: Payphones use 40 88 XX XX

Mobile

See also 
 Telecommunications in French Polynesia

References

French Polynesia
Communications in French Polynesia